Europtera is a genus of moths in the family Lasiocampidae. The genus was erected by Yves de Lajonquière in 1970.

Species
Some species of this genus are:
Europtera pandani De Lajonquière, 1972
Europtera punctillata (Saalmüller, 1884)

References

Lasiocampidae